Sabelo Sikhali Ndzinisa (born 31 July 1991) is a Liswati footballer who plays for Mbabane Highlanders of the Premier League of Eswatini, and the Eswatini national team.

International career 
Ndzinisa made his senior international debut on 11 November 2012 in a friendly draw with Lesotho.

International goals
Last updated 10 July 2022.

International career statistics

Honours 
Mbabane Swallows
Winner
 Swazi Premier League: 2012–13
 Swazi Cup: 2013

Runner-up
 Swazi Premier League (2): 2013–14, 2014–15

References

External links 
 
 

1991 births
Living people
Eswatini international footballers
Association football forwards
Mbabane Swallows players
Swazi footballers
People from Shiselweni Region